Potassium aluminium fluoride (PAF, chemical formula KAlF4) is an inorganic compound.

This compound is used as flux in the smelting of secondary aluminium, to reduce or remove the magnesium content of the melt. The main environmental issue that arises from using PAF is the production of fluoride gases. Calcium hydroxide is widely used to suppress the fluorides produced but in most cases fails to remove it sufficiently.

PAF is also present in a wide range of products for the metals industry as a fluxing agent within additives to help its dispersion within a charge.

It is also used as an insecticide.

A single natural occurrence has been reported at a burning coal bank at Forestville, Pennsylvania, as an unnamed mineral.

References

Fluorides
Metal halides
Potassium compounds
Aluminium compounds
Alkali metal fluorides